Lyana Lexa Tambala is a politician in Malawi.

Tambala represents Mulanje North in the National Assembly of Malawi. Tambala's term began on 2014-05-20.

See also
Politics of Malawi

References

Living people
Members of the National Assembly (Malawi)
21st-century Malawian politicians
Year of birth missing (living people)